The Faculty of Architecture and Arts at the Lusíada University of Porto is a private institution that offers undergraduate and postgraduate studies in architecture and design. Located in Porto, Portugal, FAAULP belongs to the Lusíada University of Porto.

Honorary doctors
Álvaro Siza
Eduardo Souto de Moura

See also
Lusíada University of Porto

External links
Faculty of Architecture and Arts at the Lusíada University of Porto

References

Design schools
Education in Porto
Architecture schools in Portugal